Trevor John Franklin (born 18 March 1962) is a New Zealand former cricketer who played 21 Tests and three One Day Internationals for New Zealand. He played first-class cricket for Auckland from 1980 to 1993. 

Franklin was known for his stoicism as a right-handed opening batsman. He scored his only Test century against England at Lord's in 1990, when he reached his century after 431 minutes and was out next ball. Over his Test career he had a meagre strike rate of 26.44. He was also known for strange injuries, including shattering his leg when he was run over by a motorised luggage trolley at Gatwick Airport in 1986 which kept him out of cricket for 18 months.

References

External links
 

1962 births
Living people
New Zealand cricketers
New Zealand Test cricketers
New Zealand One Day International cricketers
Auckland cricketers
People from Mount Eden
North Island cricketers